August T. Koerner (July 7, 1843 – April 17, 1912) was an American businessman and politician.

Biography
August T. Koerner was born in Bad Rodach, Germany. He emigrated to the United States in 1857 and settled in Vernon, Indiana, working in a mill. During the American Civil War, Koerner served in the 6th Indiana Infantry Regiment.

After, the war, Koerner moved to Troy, Illinois and worked as a bookkeeper. He married Kate McGannon and they had six children.

In 1867, he moved with his wife and family to Litchfield, Meeker County, Minnesota. Koerner was in the real estate, abstract, and insurance business. He served as Litchfield Village Clerk and as Meeker County Register of Deeds. Koerner also served as postmaster for Litchfield, Minnesota. In 1893 and 1894, Koerner served in the Minnesota House of Representatives and was a Republican since 1874. Before Koerner was involved with the Republican Party, he was a Democrat. From 1868 to 1874, Koerner was a member of the Greenback Party From 1895 to 1901, Koerner served as Minnesota State Treasurer.

He died at his home in Litchfield, Minnesota from heart problems.

Notes

1843 births
1912 deaths
German emigrants to the United States
People from Litchfield, Minnesota
People from Troy, Illinois
People from Vernon, Indiana
People of Indiana in the American Civil War
Businesspeople from Illinois
Businesspeople from Minnesota
Minnesota Democrats
Minnesota Greenbacks
Minnesota Republicans
Members of the Minnesota House of Representatives
State treasurers of Minnesota
Minnesota postmasters
19th-century American businesspeople